UTP may refer to:

Science and technology
 Uridine triphosphate, in biochemistry
 Untripentium, a hypothetical chemical element
 Unifying Theories of Programming
 Unshielded twisted pair cable
 Micro Transport Protocol, abbreviated µTP or sometimes uTP

Education
 Universiti Teknologi Petronas, also known as Petronas University of Technology, located in Seri Iskandar, Perak, Malaysia
 Technological University of Panama (Universidad Tecnológica de Panamá)
 Universidade Tuiuti do Paraná - see List of universities in Brazil by state
 University of Tehran Press
 University of Toronto Press
 University Transition Program

Music
 UTP (group), an American rap group
 Under the Pink, the second album from singer/songwriter Tori Amos
 utp_ (album), a 2008 collaboration between Alva Noto, Ryuichi Sakamoto, and Ensemble Modern
 Unblessing the Purity, a 2008 death metal EP by Bloodbath

Other uses
 Uptown Projects, New Orleans Public Housing
 United Tanganyika Party, a politician party in Tanganyika (now Tanzania) from 1956 to 1962
 United Tasmania Party, a political party, forerunner of the Australian Greens
 Unassisted triple play, in baseball
 Unlisted Trading Privileges, permission to trade unlisted securities, granted by the Securities Exchange Act of 1934
 UTP, IATA airport code for U-Tapao International Airport, Thailand
 utp, ISO 639-3 code for the Amba language (Solomon Islands)
 Urban Theatre Projects, an Australian theatre company